The aversive or evitative case (abbreviated ) is a grammatical case found in Australian Aboriginal languages that indicates that the marked noun is avoided or feared.

Usage
For example, in Walmajarri:

The suffix -karrarla indicates that the action (running away) was carried out in order to avoid the dust storm, tjurtu-.

The aversive may also be used to mark the object of verbs of fearing. For example, in Djabugay:

The aversive may be used on a nominalized verb, to produce an equivalent of English "lest". For example, "lest they be forgotten" could be encoded as "to avoid forgetting them".

Languages
Few languages have a distinct aversive case. Usually, a single case will be used both for the aversive and other functions.

Languages with a distinct aversive case include:
Arrernte
Djabugay
Gumbaynggir
Marri Ngarr
Marrithiyel
Walmajarri
Warlmanpa
Warlpiri
Warumungu
the Western Desert Language
Yidinj

References

Australian Aboriginal languages
Grammatical cases
Case